Beam me up may refer to:

Beam me up, Scotty, a catch-phrase originating from Star Trek
Using the Transporter
"Beam Me Up, Scotty" (D.C. Scorpio song), a 1988 song by D.C. Scorpio
Beam Me Up Scotty (mixtape), a 2009 mixtape by Nicki Minaj 
"Beam Me Up" (song), a 2008 song by Tay Dizm
"Beam Me Up", a 2012 song by Pink from her album The Truth About Love
"Beam Me Up", also known as "Beam Me Up (Kill Mode)", a 2012 song by Cazzette
"Beam Me Up Scotty" (2point4 children), an episode of British TV show 2point4 children
Beam Me Up!, a 2010 album by Daniel Johnston